Ja saapuu oikea yö (English title: Hush) is a 2012 Finnish thriller film directed by Jyri Kähönen. The story evolves around two young lovers who plan to murder the girl's father.

Cast 
Jarkko Niemi as Sakari
Jemina Sillanpää as Veera
Martti Suosalo as Aarne
Kaija Pakarinen as Marja
Antti Virmavirta as Olli

References

External links 
 

2012 films
2012 thriller films
Finnish thriller films
2010s Finnish-language films